Hari Om Pandey is an Indian politician belonging to the Bharatiya Janata Party (BJP). He served as the Member of the Parliament (Lok Sabha), from 2014 to 2019. He won in the 2014 Indian general elections from the Ambedkar Nagar constituency in the state of Uttar Pradesh.. He defeated his nearest rival Rakesh Pandey of Bahujan Samaj Party (BSP) by a margin of 139,429 votes. He is currently serving as member of legislative council (MLC) from Ayodhya-Ambedkarnagar seat. He is the first person from BJP to win Ambedkar nagar constituency. He is also cousin of NRI Researcher Kaushlendra Tripathi.

Positions held

 May 2014: Elected to 16th Lok Sabha
 1 Sep. 2014 onwards: Member, Standing Committee on Human Resource Development; Member, Consultative Committee, Ministry of Youth Affairs and Sports

References

Living people
India MPs 2014–2019
People from Ambedkar Nagar district
Lok Sabha members from Uttar Pradesh
Bharatiya Janata Party politicians from Uttar Pradesh
1956 births
Members of the Uttar Pradesh Legislative Council